Toyota Motor Corporation's M family of engines were a longitudinally mounted straight-6 engine design. They were used from the 1960s through the 1990s. All M family engines were OHC designs. While the M family was born with a chain-driven single camshaft it evolved into a belt-driven DOHC system after 1980. All M family engines used a cast-iron block with an aluminum cylinder head, and were built at the Toyota Kamigo plant in Toyota City, Japan.

The M-E variant, available only in the Japanese domestic market, was the first Toyota engine to be equipped with fuel injection (around the same time as the 4-cylinder 18R-E). The 4M-E was the first Toyota engine to be equipped with fuel injection for non-Japanese markets. The M family were Toyota's most prestigious engines (apart from the uncommon V family V8) for over 30 years. They were commonly found on the large Toyota Crown, Mark II, and Supra models.

M
The first M was a  version produced from 1965 through 1988. It was a 2-valve SOHC engine.

The "M-C" engine, for commercial vehicles such as the Crown Van produces .

Anti emissions versions, the M-U and M-EU, replaced the M and M-E on the Japanese market in mid 1976. The emissions system was called TTC (Toyota Total Clean), with a "-C" to denote the installation of a catalytic converter. For commercial vehicles, the emissions controlled carburetted version was called the M-J.

Applications (calendar years):
 1962–1967 Toyota Crown MS40 (second generation)
 1967–1971 Toyota Crown MS50 (third generation)
 1971–1974 Toyota Crown MS60/62/70 (fourth generation)
 1974–1979 Toyota Crown MS80/82/87/90/100/102/107 (fifth generation)
 1979–1983 Toyota Crown MS117V (seventh generation)
 1972–1979 Toyota Corona Mark II X10/20/30/40

M-P
An LPG version, the M-P and M-PU was produced from 1966 through 1989. The earliest models were simply called the M-LPG, with the emissions scrubbed M-PU replacing it in mid-1976.

 1983–1987 Toyota Crown MS120 (seventh generation)
 1987–1989 Toyota Crown MS130 (eighth generation)

M-E

The M-E appeared in the 1972–1976 Toyota Corona Mark II LG sedan and hardtop as sold in Japan. It was not sold outside Japan.

The M-E was redesignated as the M-EU for the Japanese market in December 1976 when it received the TTC-C (Toyota Total Clean), catalytic converter to meet anti-emissions laws.

Applications (calendar years):
 1972–1980 Toyota Corona Mark II L and LG sedan and hardtop

M-TEU
It used a Garret T-03 turbo.

In 1983, Toyota added an air/water intercooler to the M-TEU.

Applications (calendar years):
 1980 Toyota Supra MA46
 1980 Toyota Soarer MZ10
 1980 Toyota Crown
 1980 Toyota Corona Mark II
 1982–1986 Toyota Celica XX (Japan)

2M
It was produced from November 1966 to September 1974.

Applications (calendar years):
 Crown MS45/47 (November 1966 – August 1967)
 Crown MS51/53/55/57 (September 1967 – January 1971)
 Crown MS64/67 (February 1971 – September 1974)
 Corona Mark II MX12/22/28 (1972–74)
 2000GT MF12

3M

This special engine shared the original M's block but featured an aluminum sump, a special Yamaha-designed aluminum head with wide 79° valves and a hemispherical shape. It powered the Yamaha/Toyota MF10 2000GT, which 'Import Tuner' magazine has described as "the first true original Japanese supercar".

Applications (calendar years):
 Toyota 2000GT MF10

4M

The fuel-injected 4M-E was produced from 1978 through 1980. It was also a 2-valve SOHC engine.

Applications (calendar years):
 1978–1980 Toyota Supra
 1974–1980 Corona Mark II/Cressida/Chaser
 1971–1979 Toyota Crown

5M
Although 2-valve SOHC and carbureted versions were made, it is the fuel-injected DOHC 5M-GE that is the most common.

This engine was used in the Supra in Australia as well as Sweden and Switzerland, while Swiss buyers were also offered this engine in the Cressida and the Crown.

In Europe (aside from Sweden and Switzerland, who received the same spec engine as Australia) the 5M-E produced  in the Crown MS112 and the Celica Supra MA61.

Applications (calendar years):
 5M
 Toyota Crown MS112, MS122, MS132
 5M-EU (Japan), 5M-E
 1979–1989 Toyota Crown MS112, MS122, MS133
 1980–1986 Toyota Celica Supra MA47, MA56, MA61
 1980–1987 Toyota Cressida MX62, MX63,  MX72, MX73

5M-GE
The 12-valve (2 valves per cylinder) DOHC 5M-GE is familiar as the engine of the Toyota Supra and Toyota Cressida of the 1980s. It was quite different from any previous member of the M family, with Bosch L-Jetronic-derived electronic fuel-injection (using an AFM intake measuring scheme), wide-angle valves, and belt-driven dual camshafts. It used hydraulic valve lifters, a first for Toyota. The use of rocker arms and valve lash adjusters eliminated the need for valve clearance maintenance, a world first for any twin cam engine. This version of the M made its US debut in 1982's Toyota Celica Supra MK2. The 1982 version had a vacuum-advance distributor, whereas the 1983–1988 versions found in the Celica Supra and Cressida had full electronic control of the ignition system and distributor.

Outfitted with kits like the Kuwahara 3100, these engines were often used quite successfully in powerboat racing in the mid 1980s.

Specifications:
 Valvetrain: DOHC 2 valves per cylinder
 Forced Induction: None
 Displacement: 
 Bore x stroke: 
 Compression Ratio: 8.1:1 to 9.2:1
 Power: 
 Torque: 
 Production: 1982–1988

Applications (calendar years):
 1981.07–1986 Toyota Celica XX/Supra MA61
 1982–1988 Toyota Cressida MX62, MX63, MX72, MX73
 1981.08–1984.08 Toyota Crown MS120
 1981.02–? Toyota Soarer MZ11

Differences between years on US model of the Celica Supra:
 1982 Supra 5M-GE had vacuum-advance distributors and 9-to-0 volt output AFMs.
 1982–1983 Supra 5M-GE had dual V-belt accessory drive, 65 amp alternator, square-tooth camshaft belts, 8.8:1 compression ratio, shallower oil pan, and round intake runners.
 1983–1985.5 Supra 5M-GE had 0- to 5-volt output AFM's and TCCS.
 1984–1985.5 Supra 5M-GE had 7-rib serpentine accessory drive belts, 60 amp alternator, round-tooth camshaft belts, 9.2:1 compression ratio, knock sensor, deeper oil pan, and D-shaped intake runners.

6M-GE
This necessitated the fitment of larger diameter intake runners  versus . Only produced in 12-valve (2 valves per cylinder) DOHC/fuel-injected versions, it was available as the 6M-GE and Japan-spec 6M-GEU from 1984 through 1987. The 6M engine used the same crank, machined to accept a different torsional damper, as the 1986–1989 7M-GE and 7M-GTE engines; this fact is witnessed by the designation "6M" stamped on the counterweight of the crank on the earlier 1986–1988 7M engines.

The 6M-GEU is usually the lower powered variant of 6M engines, due to more restrictive exhaust and increased emissions-control hardware. Even though it was never offered in US-market vehicles, it is sometimes imported from countries where it was available and transplanted into US-market Celica Supras and MX63 and MX73 Cressidas, since it is externally identical to the 5M-GE.

Applications (calendar years):
 Toyota Crown
 Toyota Soarer (MZ12)

7M-GE
The Toyota 7M-GE introduced in the early months of 1986 is a  24-valve (4 valves per cylinder) DOHC/fuel-injected engine. The valves are spaced at a performance-oriented 50° angle.

The 7M-GE was produced from 1986 through 1992.

Specifications:
 Displacement: 
 Bore x stroke: 
 Compression Ratio: 9.1:1
 Weight: 

Applications (calendar years):
 1986–1992 Toyota Supra MkIII (MA70)
 1989–1992 Toyota Cressida Mark II (MX83)
 Toyota Chaser
 Toyota Crown
 Toyota Cressida 3.0i Twincam/3.0GLS (MX75) South Africa only

7M-GTE
The turbocharged 7M-GTE was produced from 1986 to 1992. It was Toyota's top performance engine until it was replaced by the JZ-series engines.

This was used only in the racing homologation Toyota Supra Turbo A road and race cars. The Turbo A models also measured air based on manifold pressure rather than using an air flow meter, had a larger intercooler, larger throttle body, optimized CT-26 turbo, and various other differences. It was one of the fastest Japanese car at the time. The homologation was for the Group A series. The Group A Supra with a 7M-GTE and CT26 turbo produced .

Specifications:

 Displacement: 
 Bore x stroke: 
 Compression Ratio: 8.4:1
 Weight: 

Applications (calendar years):
 1986–1992 Toyota Supra (MA70)
 1986–1991 Toyota Soarer (MZ20/MZ21)

See also
 List of Toyota engines
 Toyota UZ engine
 Toyota JZ engine

References

External links

The Illustrated History of the M engine
5M and 6M engine Tech Notes
7M engine Tech Notes

M
Straight-six engines